Marguerite "Peggy" Guggenheim (August 26, 1898 – December 23, 1979) was an American art collector, bohemian and socialite. Born to the wealthy New York City Guggenheim family, she was the daughter of Benjamin Guggenheim, who went down with the Titanic in 1912, and the niece of Solomon R. Guggenheim, who established the Solomon R. Guggenheim Foundation. Guggenheim collected art in Europe and America primarily between 1938 and 1946. She exhibited this collection as she built it; in 1949, she settled in Venice, where she lived and exhibited her collection for the rest of her life. The Peggy Guggenheim Collection is a modern art museum on the Grand Canal in Venice, Italy, and is one of the most visited attractions in Venice.

Early life
Guggenheim's parents were of Ashkenazi Jewish descent. Her mother, Florette Seligman (1870–1937), was a member of the Seligman family. Guggenheim's father, Benjamin Guggenheim, a member of the Guggenheim family, who died in the sinking of the Titanic, had not amassed the fortune of his siblings; therefore her inheritance was far less than that of her cousins. She also had a sister, Barbara Hazel Guggenheim, who became a painter and art collector.

She first worked as a clerk in an avant-garde bookstore, the Sunwise Turn, in mid-town Manhattan, where she became enamored of the members of the bohemian artistic community. In 1920 she went to live in Paris, France. Once there, she became friendly with avant-garde writers and artists, many of whom were living in poverty in the Montparnasse quarter of the city. Man Ray photographed her, and was, along with Constantin Brâncuși and Marcel Duchamp, a friend whose art she was eventually to promote.

She became close friends with writer Natalie Barney and artist Romaine Brooks and was a regular at Barney's salon. She met Djuna Barnes during this time, and in time became her friend and patron. Barnes wrote her best-known novel, Nightwood, while staying at the Devon country house, Hayford Hall, that Guggenheim had rented for two summers.

Guggenheim urged Emma Goldman to write her autobiography and helped to secure funds for her to live in Saint-Tropez, France, while writing her two volume Living My Life. Guggenheim wrote her own autobiography entitled Out of This Century, later revised and re-published as Confessions of an Art Addict which was released in 1946 and is now published with Harper Collins.

Collecting, before World War II

In January 1938, Guggenheim opened a gallery for modern art in London featuring Jean Cocteau drawings in its first show, and began to collect works of art. Guggenheim often purchased at least one object from each of her exhibitions at the gallery. After the outbreak of World War II, she purchased as much abstract and Surrealist art as possible.

Her first gallery was called Guggenheim Jeune, the name ingeniously chosen to associate her gallery with both the epitome of a gallery, the French Bernheim-Jeune, and with the name of her own well-known family. The gallery on 30 Cork Street, next to Roland Penrose's and E. L. T. Mesens' show-case for the Surrealist movement, proved to be successful, thanks to many friends who gave advice and who helped to run the gallery. Marcel Duchamp, whom she had known since the early 1920s, when she lived in Paris with her first husband Laurence Vail, had introduced Guggenheim to the art world; it was through him that she met many artists during her frequent visits to Paris. He taught her about contemporary art and styles, and he conceived several of the exhibitions held at Guggenheim Jeune.

The Cocteau exhibition was followed by exhibitions of Wassily Kandinsky (his first one-man-show in England), Yves Tanguy, Wolfgang Paalen and several other well-known and some lesser-known artists. Peggy Guggenheim also held group exhibitions of sculpture and collage, with the participation of the now-classic moderns Antoine Pevsner, Henry Moore, Henri Laurens, Alexander Calder, Raymond Duchamp-Villon, Constantin Brâncuși, John Ferren, Jean Arp, Max Ernst, Pablo Picasso, Georges Braque and Kurt Schwitters. She also greatly admired the work of John Tunnard (1900–1971) and is credited with his discovery in mainstream international modernism.

Plans for a museum
When Guggenheim realized that her gallery, although well received, had made a loss of £600 in the first year, she decided to spend her money in a more practical way. A museum for contemporary arts was exactly the institution she could see herself supporting. Most certainly on her mind also were the adventures in New York City of her uncle, Solomon R. Guggenheim, who, with the help and encouragement of artist Baroness Hilla von Rebay, had created the Solomon R. Guggenheim Foundation two years earlier. The main aim of this foundation had been to collect and to further the production of abstract art, resulting in the opening of the Museum of Non-objective Painting (known as the Solomon R. Guggenheim Museum after 1952) in Manhattan during 1939. Guggenheim closed Guggenheim Jeune with a farewell party on 22 June 1939, at which colour portrait photographs by Gisèle Freund were projected on the walls. She started making plans for a Museum of Modern Art in London together with the English art historian and art critic Herbert Read. She set aside $40,000 for the museum's running costs. However, these funds were soon overstretched by the organisers' ambitions.

In August 1939, Guggenheim left for Paris to negotiate loans of artworks for the first exhibition. In her luggage was a list drawn up by Herbert Read for this occasion. Shortly after her departure the Second World War broke out, and the events following 1 September 1939 made her abandon the scheme, willingly or not. She then "decided now to buy paintings by all the painters who were on Herbert Read's list. Having plenty of time and all the museum's funds at my disposal, I put myself on a regime to buy one picture a day." When finished, she had acquired 10 Picassos, 40 Ernsts, eight Mirós, four Magrittes, four Ferrens, three Man Rays, three Dalís, one Klee, one Wolfgang Paalen and one Chagall, among others. In the meantime, she had also made new plans and in April 1940 had rented a large space in the Place Vendôme as a new home for her museum.

A few days before the Germans reached Paris, Guggenheim had to abandon her plans for a Paris museum, and fled to the south of France, from where, after months of safeguarding her collection and artist friends, she left Europe for New York in the summer of 1941. There, in the following year, she opened a new gallery—which actually was in part a museum—at 30 West 57th Street. It was called The Art of This Century. Three of the four galleries were dedicated to Cubist and Abstract art, Surrealism and Kinetic art, with only the fourth, the front room, being a commercial gallery. Guggenheim held other important shows, such as the Exhibition by 31 Women, the first documented all female art exhibition in the United States of America, at the gallery. This 1943 month long exhibition gathered together artists ranging from notable figures like Frida Kahlo, Gypsy Rose Lee, Meret Oppenheim, Leonora Carrington, and Louise Nevelson, to others who were unknown artists in New York. 

Her interest in new art was instrumental in advancing the careers of several important modern artists including the American painters Jackson Pollock and William Congdon, the Austrian surrealist Wolfgang Paalen, the sound poet Ada Verdun Howell and the German painter Max Ernst, whom she married in December 1941. She had assembled her collection in only seven years.

The collection, after World War II

Following World War II – and her 1946 divorce from Max Ernst – she closed The Art of This Century Gallery in 1947, and returned to Europe, deciding to live in Venice, Italy. In 1948, she was invited to exhibit her collection in the disused Greek Pavilion of the Venice Biennale and in 1949 established herself in the Palazzo Venier dei Leoni ('unfinished palazzo of the lions') on the Grand Canal.

Her collection became one of the few European collections of modern art to promote a significant number of works by Americans. In the 1950s she promoted the art of two local painters, Edmondo Bacci and Tancredi Parmeggiani. By the early 1960s, Guggenheim had almost stopped collecting art and began to concentrate on presenting what she already owned. She loaned out her collection to museums in Europe and in 1969 to the Solomon R. Guggenheim Museum in New York City, which was named after her uncle. Eventually, she decided to donate her home and her collection to the Solomon R. Guggenheim Foundation, a gift which was concluded inter vivos in 1976, before her death in 1979.

The Peggy Guggenheim Collection is one of the most important museums in Italy for European and American art of the first half of the 20th century. Pieces in her collection embrace Cubism, Surrealism and abstract expressionism.

Guggenheim lived in Venice until her death in Camposampiero near Padua, Italy, after a stroke. Her ashes are interred in the garden (later the Nasher Sculpture Garden) of her home, the Palazzo Venier dei Leoni (inside the Peggy Guggenheim Collection), next to her dogs.

Private life
According to both Guggenheim and her biographer Anton Gill, it was believed that while living in Europe, she had "slept with 1,000 men". She claimed to have had affairs with numerous artists and writers, and in return many artists and others have claimed affairs with her. When asked by conductor Thomas Schippers how many husbands she had, she replied, "You mean my own, or other people's?" In her autobiography, Peggy provides the names of some of these lovers, including Yves Tanguy, Roland Penrose and E. L. T. Mesens.

Her first marriage was to Laurence Vail, a Dada sculptor and writer with whom she had two children, Michael Cedric Sindbad Vail (1923–1986) and Pegeen Vail Guggenheim (1925–1967). They divorced in about 1928 following his affair with writer Kay Boyle, whom he later married. Soon after her first marriage dissolved, she had an affair with John Ferrar Holms, a writer with writer's block who had been a war hero. Starting in December 1939, she and Samuel Beckett had a brief but intense affair, and he encouraged her to turn exclusively to modern art. She married her second husband, painter Max Ernst, in 1941 and divorced him in 1946. Among her eight grandchildren is Karole Vail, who was appointed director of the Peggy Guggenheim Collection in 2017.

Portrayal in popular culture
 Guggenheim was portrayed by Amy Madigan in the movie Pollock (2000), directed by and starring Ed Harris, based on the life of Jackson Pollock.
 A play by Lanie Robertson based on Guggenheim's life, Woman Before a Glass, opened at the Promenade Theatre on Broadway, New York on March 10, 2005. This one-woman show focuses on Guggenheim's later life. Mercedes Ruehl played Guggenheim and received an Obie Award for her performance. In May 2011, the Abingdon Theater Arts Complex in New York featured a revival of this play, starring veteran stage actress Judy Rosenblatt, directed by Austin Pendleton.
 In Bethan Roberts' first play for radio, My Own Private Gondolier, Guggenheim's troubled daughter, Pegeen, leaves her three children behind when she travels to Venice to spend the summer with her mother. The play was first broadcast on BBC Radio 4 on October 19, 2010; Guggenheim was played by Fiona Shaw; Pegeen was played by Hattie Morahan.
 In April 2015, a new documentary film, Peggy Guggenheim: Art Addict, began premiering at film festivals, including the San Francisco Jewish Film Festival on July 26, 2015.
 Guggenheim is a minor character in the narrative non-fiction  Leonora in the Morning Light, by Michaela Carter, published in 2021
 Kay Boyle's semi-autobiographical novel My Next Bride includes a fictionalized portrayal of Guggenheim.

References
Notes

Sources

Further reading
 Davidson, Susan and Philip Rylands, eds. (2005). "Peggy Guggenheim & Fredrick Kiesler: The Story of Art of This Century" (exhibition catalogue), Venice: Peggy Guggenheim Collection  
 Dearborn, Mary V. Affairs of the Art: Mistress of Modernism, The Life of Peggy Guggenheim (Houghton Mifflin, 2004)
 
 
 Weld, Jacqueline Bograd. Peggy, the Wayward Guggenheim (New York: E. P. Dutton, 1986)

External links
 
 "Peggy Guggenheim: Mistress of Modernism" by Helen Gent, Marie Claire, 19 June 2009
 

American art collectors
Philanthropists from New York (state)
American socialites
Museum founders
1898 births
1979 deaths
Peggy Guggenheim
Jewish American art collectors
Jewish American philanthropists
American people of Dutch-Jewish descent
American people of German-Jewish descent
American people of Swiss-Jewish descent
American expatriates in France
American emigrants to Italy
American founders
People from New York City
People from Venice
20th-century art collectors
20th-century American women
Max Ernst
American art dealers
Women art dealers
Women art collectors